Vidas Bičiulaitis (born August 11, 1971) is a retired boxer from Lithuania. He represented his native country at the 2000 Summer Olympics in Sydney, Australia, where he lost in the second round of the men's featherweight division (– 57 kg) to Russia's eventual bronze medalist Kamil Djamaloudinov.

References
sports-reference

1971 births
Living people
Featherweight boxers
Boxers at the 2000 Summer Olympics
Olympic boxers of Lithuania
Lithuanian male boxers
AIBA World Boxing Championships medalists